An Inventory of Church Property is a process carried out when there is a new custodian of a church office; in the Church of England this is known as a Terrier, from Glebe terrier.

Description

Within the Catholic Church, this was an issue for bishops and abbots in the Middle Ages as they were often of noble birth and so would often have both property and recognised heirs.  Under the Council of Trent inventories, were required of substantial officeholders on an annual basis, and were not to be administered by the officeholders, in a similar way to modern audits of companies.

Canon Law before the Council of Trent made no clear mention of the need for church inventories, although bishops were ordered to separate carefully their own property from that of their church office so that the bishop's heirs could not seize the church's goods, or the Church lay claim to the Bishop's personal goods.

The most important document relating to the inventories of church property is the Motu Proprio, “Provida”, by Sixtus V in 1587. The original idea was to establish a general ecclesiastical record office at Rome to store the inventories of all the church property in Italy although this was abandoned as these inventories already existed in many Episcopal archives with bishops verifying the inventories when during their pastoral visits. However, Sixtus still commanded all other Bishops to create an inventory of the property of all the churches and ecclesiastical establishments within their dioceses.

This was renewed by Pope Benedict XIII in 1725 and Pius X in 1904.

The expectation is that every administrator of church property on assuming office must draw up an exact inventory of property from his office with two copies sent, one to his archives and the other to the relevant bishop (in some countries a third copy must be sent to the civil authorities). When the term of office ends, the officeholder must hand over to his successor all articles entered in the inventory.  This verification is done in a document which discharges the retiring official and places the responsibility on his successor. During the period of management the administrator must keep his inventory up to date, that is to say, he must make a record, with due legal formalities, of any changes to the inventory.  There is an important role for Bishops visits where a bishop is often expected to examine the inventory.

The rise of financial reporting has meant that in many cases this is done through the production and often external auditing of church accounts.  So although the bishop still does have a role within the Catholic church as the guardian of church assets, the role of episcopal visitations and inventories when the officeholder changes is not as important although can still be a symbolic part of an officeholders' induction.

References

Catholic Church organisation
Canon law
Asset lists